Vieux Fort is a town located near the southernmost point of Saint Lucia, a Caribbean island nation. It is named after a fort that used to watch out towards Saint Vincent towards the south. The population of the town was 4,574 in 2010, while the surrounding district of Vieux Fort has a total population of about 15,132 in 2010.

History
In the 18th and 19th centuries it was an important centre of the sugar industry in Saint Lucia before that industry declined.

During World War II, the Americans constructed an airfield called Beane Army Airfield. After the war it was subsequently expanded to form Hewanorra International Airport.

Today, Vieux Fort is the main point of entry for Saint Lucia and also hosts a port just to the south of the town. It is also a major industrial area and also hosts other places such as St Jude's Hospital and the George Odlum Stadium.

See also
List of cities in Saint Lucia
List of rivers of Saint Lucia
Vieux Fort District (formerly Quarter)
Vieux Fort River

References

 
Populated coastal places in Saint Lucia
Towns in Saint Lucia